Dorf may refer to:

 Dorf (surname)
 Dorf (character), portrayed by Tim Conway
 Dorf, German term for 'village', see Town#Germany
 Dorf, Germany (disambiguation), various settlements
 Dorf, Switzerland, a small town
 DORF (film festival), Croatia

See also
 Dorff
 Dorp (disambiguation)
 Thorp (disambiguation)